The Webster (also known as The Webster Miami) is a luxury multi-brand fashion house operating ten physical boutiques in the U.S. and an online store. The multi-brand boutique sells designer brands (Balmain, Celine, Chanel, Dior, Givenchy, Yves Saint Laurent) and many others. The Webster has collaborated with worldwide major retailers such as Le Bon Marche, Target, Ritz Paris, and most recently, Lane Crawford.

History

The Webster was founded in 2009 by Laure Hériard-Dubreuil who serves as the company founder and CEO.

The Webster sells women’s, men’s, and children's ready-to-wear and luxury accessories such as shoes, bags, jewelry and watches.

The South Beach flagship is a 20,000-square-foot, three-level store in South Beach’s Art Deco District. The Webster now has five locations across the United States in South Beach and Bal Harbour, Florida, New York City, New York, Houston, Texas and Costa Mesa, California. The fifth and newest location opened in SoHo, New York City, in November 2017. Measuring approximately 12,000 square feet, the building, which dates to 1878, features six floors, including a penthouse and a David Mallet salon.

The Webster has collaborated with brands on exclusive products such as Pierre Hardy, Calvin Klein, Anthony Vaccarello, Proenza Schouler, Berluti, and Balenciaga.

In January 2015, The Webster collaborated with Le Bon Marché Paris on a capsule collection for the store’s annual “Month of White.” Laure Heriard-Dubreuil helped design and organize the collection alongside 50 designers, including Louis Vuitton. The collection was sold exclusively at The Webster Miami and Le Bon Marché in Paris.  The Webster has recently collaborated with luxury Chinese department store Lane Crawford on an exclusive collection. Over 20 brands, including Coach, Courrèges, Maison Michel, Proenza Schouler, Sonia Rykiel and Thom Browne, have created exclusive products for the collaboration, all inspired by The Webster’s flamingo logo.

Products

Over the course of its existence, The Webster has featured brands and designers including Azzedine Alaïa, Balenciaga, Balmain, Berluti, Celine, Chanel, Delpozo, Marc Jacobs, Margiela, Off-White, Pierre Hardy, Sacai, Stella Jean, and Yves Saint Laurent.

References

External links
 Official website

Retail companies established in 2009
Companies based in Miami
2009 establishments in Florida